Encephalartos marunguensis, the Marungu cycad, is a species of cycad in Africa.

It is found in the Democratic Republic of the Congo (in the Marungu Mountains and on Muhila plateau) and Tanzania (about 100 km west of Marungu) in the southeast of the country.

Description
It is an acaule plant, with a partially underground stem up to 40 cm high and with a diameter of 15 cm.

The leaves are 50–80 cm long, bluish green in color, strongly keeled. The rachis is green, with the upper part clearly curved. The linear leaflets, 10–12 cm long, are arranged on the rachis in the opposite way, with an obtuse angle of insertion, which varies from 45 to 80°; the margins are integer and smooth. The leaves of the basal part are often reduced to spines.

It is a dioecious species, with ovoid-shaped male cones, bluish green in color, 18–25 cm long and 5–7.5 cm wide. The female cones, about the same shape, are 20-30 cm long and have a diameter of 10-15 cm. Both are produced in numbers ranging from one to three.

The seeds, 20–30 mm long, have an oblong shape and are covered by a red or yellow sarcotesta.

References

External links

marunguensis